Noon is a surname and Punjabi Jat clan of India and Pakistan. They are also found in Europe, and North America.

Notable people with the surname, who may or may not be affiliated with the clan, are listed below:

People
People with the surname Noon:
 Carole C. Noon, American primatologist 
 Colin Noon, rugby union footballer for Leeds Tykes
 David Noon (born 1946), American composer
 Ed Noon, character in Michael Avallone's novels
 Frank Noon, Def Leppard's second drummer
 Gladys Noon Spellman, U.S. Congresswoman
 Jamie Noon, English rugby union player
 Jeff Noon, (born 1957), English science fiction author
 Mark Noon, semi-professional English football player
 Micky Noon, professional English football player
 Steve Noon, British artist
 Thomas Noon Talfourd, English judge and author
 Vicki Noon, American theater performer
 Wayne Noon, English cricketer
 Will Noon, drummer of Straylight Run and the former drummer of Breaking Pangaea

People from Pakistan and India 
 Gulam Noon, Baron Noon, British businessman originally from India
 Feroz Khan Noon (1893 – 1970), politician and former 7th prime minister of Pakistan, from Sargodha District
 Malik Adnan Hayat Noon, politician in Pakistan and member of the Noon family of Pakistan
 Malik Amjad Ali Noon, Pakistani politician
 Malik Anwer Ali Noon (1924 – 2014), politician and landlord of Sargodha in the Noon family
 Viqar un Nisa Noon (1920 – 2000), wife of the 7th Prime Minister of Pakistan, Feroz Khan Noon

See also
 Noon (disambiguation)

References

External links

Punjabi tribes
Jat clans
Punjabi-language surnames
Indian names
Pakistani names